KGB: The Secret War is a 1985 American film directed by Dwight H. Little.

Plot
A spy thriller about a KGB agent operating inside the U.S. who wants to defect. The agent steals top secret computer microchips as barter material to switch sides and is hunted by a U.S. agent.

Cast
Michael Billington as Peter Hubbard
Denise DuBarry as Adèle Martin
Michael Ansara as Lyman Taylor
Walter Gotell as Nicholai
Sally Kellerman as Fran Simpson
 Christopher Cary as Alex Stafanac
 Philip Levien as Ryder
 Julian Barnes as Hya Koslov
Paul Linke as Frank
Richard Pachorek as Martine
Gerrod Miskovsky as Theodor
Kim Joseph as Shirley Marks

External links

1985 films
1985 drama films
American drama films
American spy films
Films directed by Dwight H. Little
Cold War spy films
1985 directorial debut films
Films about the KGB
1980s English-language films
1980s American films